Karim Ghazi (born January 6, 1979) is an Algerian former professional footballer who played as a defensive midfielder.

From 2002 to 2005, Ghazi made 16 appearances for the Algeria national team.

Club career
On July 24, 2011, Ghazi signed a two-year contract with MC Alger, joining them on a free transfer from USM Alger.

Career statistics

International

Honours
USM Alger
 Algerian league: 1996, 2002, 2003, 2005
 Algerian Cup: 1997, 1999, 2001, 2003

ES Tunis
 Tunisian league: 2004

References

1979 births
Living people
Association football midfielders
Algerian footballers
Algeria international footballers
Algerian expatriate footballers
Footballers from Algiers
USM Alger players
CR Belouizdad players
Espérance Sportive de Tunis players
Expatriate footballers in Tunisia
Algerian Ligue Professionnelle 1 players
Algerian expatriate sportspeople in Tunisia
21st-century Algerian people